This is an in-complete alphabetical list of constituency election results to the 32nd Parliament of the United Kingdom at the 1922 general election, held on Wednesday 15 November 1922.

Notes
Change in % vote and swing is calculated between the winner and second place and their respective performances at the 1918 election. A plus denotes a swing to the winner and a minus against the winner.

England

London Boroughs

adopted as official Liberal candidate, but party withdrew support during campaign following exposure of crooked past

English Boroughs

Barrow and Furness

English Counties

Scotland

Wales

Northern Ireland

anti-partition

Universities

References

1922
1922 United Kingdom general election